The Mombum languages, also known as the Komolom or Muli Strait languages, are a pair of Trans–New Guinea languages, Mombum (Komolom) and Koneraw, spoken on Komolom Island just off Yos Sudarso Island, and on the southern coast of Yos Sudarso Island, respectively, on the southern coast of New Guinea. Komolom Island is at the southern end of the Muli Strait.

History of classification
Mombum was first classified as a branch isolate of the Central and South New Guinea languages in Stephen Wurm's 1975 expansion for Trans–New Guinea, a position tentatively maintained by Malcolm Ross, though he cannot tell if the similarities are shared innovations or retentions from proto-TNG. Usher instead links them to the Asmat languages. Koneraw is clearly related to Mombum, but was overlooked by early classifications. Along with the Kolopom languages, they are the languages spoken on Yos Sudarso Island (Kolopom Island).

Noting insufficient evidence, Pawley and Hammarström (2018), who refer to the languages as the Komolom branch, tentatively leave it as unclassified rather than as part of Trans-New Guinea.

Pronouns
Pronouns are:
{|
! !!sg!!pl
|-
!1
|*nu||*nu-mu, *ni
|-
!2
|*yu||*yu-mu
|-
!3
|*eu
|}

Vocabulary comparison
The following basic vocabulary words are from McElhanon & Voorhoeve (1970) and Voorhoeve (1975), as cited in the Trans-New Guinea database:

{| class="wikitable sortable"
! gloss !! Koneraw !! Mombum
|-
! head
| wonderam || wondrum
|-
! hair
| cin || xu-sin
|-
! eye
| dyan || musax-nam
|-
! tooth
| cire || zix
|-
! leg
| kan || kaŋk
|-
! louse
| am || am
|-
! dog
| ubui || ipwi
|-
! pig
| u || u
|-
! bird
| baŋa || konji
|-
! egg
|  || yausil
|-
! blood
| iri || iri
|-
! bone
| iŋar || itöx
|-
! skin
| par || par
|-
! tree
| to || tu
|-
! man
| nam || nam
|-
! sun
| dzuwo || zawa
|-
! water
| mui || mwe
|-
! fire
| war || wad
|-
! stone
| mate || mete
|-
! name
| ur || ur
|-
! eat
| gim-nugu || nuku-
|-
! one
| tenamotere || te
|-
! two
| kuinam || kumb
|}

References

External links 
 Timothy Usher, New Guinea World, Proto–Muli Strait

 
Languages of Indonesia
Languages of western New Guinea
Asmat–Mombum languages